Galemont is a historic home located at Broad Run, Fauquier County, Virginia.  It was built between 1778 and 1817, as a -story, two-room, stone hall-and-parlor-plan residence with a one-room cellar.  It was expanded about 1857, and included Federal / Greek Revival-style details.  In 1872, a new I-plan house was built less than 20 feet east of the original house, and connected to make one large, multi-period building with transverse center halls.  It was further enlarged in 1903, with a connection to the stone kitchen and two-story wing.  The later additions added a Folk Victorian style to the house.  Also on the property are the contributing garage, silo, old shed, pond, a fieldstone wall (c. 1824), and two archaeological sites: the 1852 Broad Run Train Depot site and an intact segment of the Thoroughfare Gap Road.

It was listed on the National Register of Historic Places in 2012.

References

Houses on the National Register of Historic Places in Virginia
Victorian architecture in Virginia
Federal architecture in Virginia
Greek Revival houses in Virginia
Houses completed in 1817
Houses in Fauquier County, Virginia
National Register of Historic Places in Fauquier County, Virginia